S. mexicana  may refer to:
 Sabal mexicana, the Mexican palmetto, Texas palmetto, Texas sabal Palm, Rio Grande palmetto or palma de Mícharos, a palm tree species native to North America
 Salvia mexicana, the Mexican sage, a herbaceous shrubby perennial species native to a wide area of central Mexico

See also
 Mexicana (disambiguation)